Idol: Jakten på en superstjerne 2004 was the second season of Idol Norway based on the British singing competition Pop Idol. It premiered one year after the first season and was aired in the first half of 2004.

Unlike last year's winner Kurt Nilsen, his successor Kjartan Salvesen was not able to build up an international career. Other alumni of this season were more successful, most notably runner-up Margaret Berger, who established a career as an electronic dance artist and went on to become the music director of NRK P3 in 2008.
 Berger would also represent Norway at the Eurovision Song Contest 2013, placing fourth.
Another contestant was Maria Haukaas Storeng who, to the surprise of many, was voted off sixth but went on to represent Norway in the Eurovision Song Contest in 2008 achieving fifth place.

Finals

Finalists
(ages stated at time of contest)

Elimination Chart

Live show details

Heat 1 (18 February 2004)

Notes
Maria Haukass Storeng and Kjartan Salvesen advanced to the top 11 of the competition. The other 8 contestants were eliminated.
Susanne Nordbøe returned for a second chance at the top 11 in the Wildcard Round.

Heat 2 (20 February 2004)

Notes
Trung Toan Tong and Roald Haarr advanced to the top 11 of the competition. The other 8 contestants were eliminated.
Stine Terese Julseth and Amalie Olsen returned for a second chance at the top 11 in the Wildcard Round.

Heat 3 (25 February 2004)

Notes
Sandra Lyng Haugen and Maren Flotve Birkeland advanced to the top 11 of the competition. The other 8 contestants were eliminated.
None of the contestants from this round made it into the Wildcard Round, making it the only group to not be represented at that stage.

Heat 4 (27 February 2004)

Notes
Anh Vu and Øystein Grønnevik advanced to the top 11 of the competition. The other 8 contestants were eliminated.
Julie Tverrå Johnsen, Margaret Berger and Tini Flaat returned for a second chance at the top 11 in the Wildcard Round.

Wildcard round (3 March 2004)

Notes
Susanne Nordbøe and Margaret Berger received the highest number of votes, and advanced to the top 11 of the competition.
Håkon Njøten won the Jury Joker, and completed the top 11.

Live Show 1 (19 March 2004)
Theme: Your Idol

Live Show 2 (26 March 2004)
Theme: Norwegian Songs

Live Show 3 (2 April 2004)
Theme: Disco

Live Show 4 (9 April 2004)
Theme: Your Birth Year

Live Show 5 (16 April 2004)
Theme: Top 20 Hits

Live Show 6 (23 April 2004)
Theme: Big Band

Live Show 7 (30 April 2004)
Theme: Film Hits

Live Show 8: Semi-final (7 May 2004)
Theme: Judge's Choice

Live final (14 May 2004)

References

External links
Profiles of the top 11 finalists

Season 02
2004 Norwegian television seasons